Desert fox may refer to:

Animals
Fennec fox (Vulpes zerda), the world's smallest canid
White-footed fox (Vulpes vulpes pusilla), also known as the desert fox

Games
Desert Fox (computer game), a 1985 game for the Commodore 64
The Desert Fox, a 1981 board wargame published in Strategy & Tactics magazine

Other uses
Nickname of World War II German field marshal Erwin Rommel
Rommel: The Desert Fox, a 1950 biography of Erwin Rommel by Desmond Young
The Desert Fox: The Story of Rommel, a 1951 movie about Erwin Rommel
The Desert Foxes, nickname for the Algeria national football team
Operation Desert Fox, the 1998 bombing of Iraq by the United States and United Kingdom

Animal common name disambiguation pages